Walter Bumby (born 26 October 1860 – fourth ¼ 1936) was an English rugby union footballer who played in the 1880s and 1890s. He played at representative level for British Isles, and Lancashire, and at club level for Swinton (captain), as a half-back. Prior to Tuesday 2 June 1896, Swinton were a rugby union club.

Background
Walter Bumby was born in Pendlebury, Lancashire, and his death aged 76 was registered in Barton-upon-Irwell, Lancashire.

Playing career

Rugby union
Walter Bumby first played rugby for his local club in his home town of Pendlebury as a three-quarter back in 1879. He was selected for the more prestigious Swinton club during the 1880/81 season playing in his usual position. During the 1882 season he was switched to the half back and his success in that position saw the club adopt him behind the scrimmage from that point on. During the 1882/83 season he was a constant choice in the Swinton team, amassing 23 tries. 

Despite his success at club level, he found it difficult to break into the county team, and during the 1883/84 season he was the first choice reserve on four occasions, though never receiving a call-up. In 1885 he got his break, when he was selected to represent Lancashire, in a game against Cheshire. He again played for Lancashire in the 1887/88 season with games against Somerset and Durham.

In 1888 Bumby was invited to join the British Isles tour of New Zealand and Australia. He played in 23 games of the tour, scoring five tries, though the team played no matches against international opposition.

Change of code
When Swinton converted from the rugby union code to the Northern Union code on Tuesday 2 June 1896, Walter Bumby would have been approximately 35 years of age. Consequently, he may have been both a rugby union and Northern Union footballer for Swinton.

Genealogical information
Walter Bumby's Baptism took place at Christ Church, Pendlebury on Sunday 30 June 1861. Walter Bumby's marriage was registered during July→September 1890 in Barton-upon-Irwell, Lancashire. They had children; Walter Melbourne Bumby (birth registered January→March 1895 in Barton-upon-Irwell, Lancashire).

Outside of rugby
Walter Bumby was the landlord of a public house.

References

External links
Search for "Bumby" at espn.co.uk (1888 British Isles tourists statistics missing (31 December 2017))
Football – British Football Team’s Visit To New Zealand.
The Return Of The English Team To Their Native Land
Marriage of Walter Melbourne Bumby
Baptism of Walter Bumby
Photograph 'Swinton 1880–81' at swintonlionstales.co.uk
Photograph 'Swinton 1882–83' at swintonlionstales.co.uk
Photograph 'Swinton 1886' at swintonlionstales.co.uk
Photograph 'Swinton 1892–93' at swintonlionstales.co.uk
myheritage.ro

1860 births
1936 deaths
British & Irish Lions rugby union players from England
English rugby union players
People from Eccles, Greater Manchester
Lancashire County RFU players
Publicans
Rugby union halfbacks
Rugby union players from Salford
Swinton Lions players